Heap or HEAP may refer to:

Computing and mathematics
 Heap (data structure), a data structure commonly used to implement a priority queue
 Heap (mathematics), a generalization of a group
 Heap (programming) (or free store), an area of memory for dynamic memory allocation
 Heapsort, a comparison-based sorting algorithm
 Heap overflow, a type of buffer overflow that occurs in the heap data area
 Sorites paradox, also known as the paradox of the heap

Other uses
 Heap (surname)
 Heaps (surname)
 Heap leaching, an industrial mining process
 Heap (comics), a golden-age comic book character 
 Heap, Bury, a former district in England
 "The Heap" (Fargo), a 2014 television episode
 High Explosive, Armor-Piercing, ammunition and ordnance
 Holocaust Education and Avoidance Pod, an idea in Neal Stephenson's novel Cryptonomicon

See also
 Skandha, Buddhist concept describing the aggregated contents of mental activity
 Beap or bi-parental heap, a data structure
 Treap, a form of binary search tree data structure
 Heapey, a village and civil parish of the Borough of Chorley, in Lancashire, England
 Pile (disambiguation)